Equalization filter may refer to:
A filter for audio equalization
A filter for communications equalization

See also
Analogue filter
Audio filter
Electronic filter